Attadale can refer to:

Attadale railway station, serving Attadale, a locality in Scotland
Attadale, Scotland, a locality in Scotland
Attadale, Western Australia, a locality in Western Australia